The Oklahoma Department of Agriculture, Food, and Forestry is a department of the government of Oklahoma under the Oklahoma Secretary of Agriculture. It is responsible for providing services and expertise that promote and protect Oklahoma's food supply and natural resources while stimulating economic growth.

The Department is governed by the State Board of Agriculture. The Board consists of five members appointed by the Governor of Oklahoma, with the approval of the Oklahoma Senate. The Governor designates one of the members as President of the Board, who serves as the Commissioner of Agriculture. The Commissioner is responsible for overseeing the day-to-day operations and policies of the Department.

The current Commissioner of Agriculture is Blayne Arthur, who was appointed by Governor Kevin Stitt in 2019.

The Department was created in 1907 during the term of Governor Charles N. Haskell.

Mission
The Agriculture Department protects and educates consumers about Oklahoma’s agricultural and livestock productions. Its purpose is to develop and execute policy on farming, agriculture, and food. It aims to meet the needs of farmers and ranchers, promote agricultural trade and production, work to assure food safety, protect natural resources, foster rural communities, also to meet the needs of Oklahomans.

Leadership
The Department is under the supervision of the Oklahoma Secretary of Agriculture. The State Board of Agriculture governs the Department and is administered by the Commissioner of Agriculture (who is the President of the State Board of Agriculture). Under Governor Kevin Stitt, Blayne Arthur is serving concurrently as both Secretary and Commissioner.

State Board of Agriculture
The governing body of the Department is the State Board of Agriculture, which is composed of five members appointed by the Governor with the consent of the Oklahoma Senate. Members must be farmers with at least five years of practical experience in agriculture. The state is divided into four agricultural districts and a member is appointed to a four-year term from each of the districts. An at large position is appointed by the Governor to be the President of the State Board of Agriculture and serves at the pleasure of the Governor.

Board members
As of 2011, the following are the members of the State Board of Agriculture:

Jim Reese, President of the Board
Ed Hurliman, Broken Bow
Jay Franklin, Vinita
Britt Hilton, Gate
Karen Krehbiel Dodson, Hydro

Organization

State Board of Agriculture
Commissioner of Agriculture
Assistant Commissioner
Associate Commissioner
Administration Division - executive office / agency services
Investigative Services Unit
Agricultural Environmental Management Services Division - protection of Oklahoma's waters and environment from animal and poultry waste
Agricultural Statistics Services Division - generates date on current crop conditions and livestock inventory numbers
Animal Industry Division - animal health and disease control programs
Consumer Protection Services Division - seed, feed, fertilizer, pesticides, nursery and weights & measures
Food Safety Division - meat, milk, egg, poultry and organic programs
Forestry Services Division - landowner assistance, tree planting, fire protection, urban forestry, and education programs
Laboratory Services Division - official state testing lab
Office of the General Counsel - enforcement of agricultural laws
Market Development Services Division - market promotion, loan programs, market news and educational programs
Wildlife Services Division - prevention of wildlife-caused damage

Staffing
The Agriculture Department, with an annual budget of over $50 million, is one of the larger employers of the State. For fiscal year 2010, the Bureau was authorized 477 full-time employees.

Budget
The Agriculture Department has an annual budget of almost $90 million. Each of the Department's operating units how the following operating budget:

Supporting agencies

Boll Weevil Eradication Organization
The purpose of the Oklahoma Boll Weevil Eradication Organization is to assist cotton growers in the State in the eradication of the boll weevil. The OBWEO is funded by assessments made against cotton producers. The board that controls the OBWEO is composed of five members, who are each elected from the cotton producers of their respective districts. The OBWEO has annual budget of just under $1 million and employs 14 people (for fiscal year 2011).

Peanut Commission
The Oklahoma Peanut Commission was established in 1965 to promote and encourage the production and sale of peanuts and related products. The Commission engages in research designed to strengthen the peanut market by developing new production methods and uses for peanuts. The Commission is composed of six members, each appointed by the Governor without the approval of the Senate. The Commission has annual budget of just under $200,000 and employs two people.

Wheat Commission
The Oklahoma Wheat Commission was established to develop and expand domestic and international markets for Oklahoma's wheat producers. The Commission is composed of five members appointed by the Governor without the approval of the Senate. The Commission is responsible for researching new wheat production techniques, provides educational material, and works to expand the wheat market. The Commission has an annual budget of over $1.5 million and employs six people.

References

External links
 Department of Agriculture homepage

Agriculture, Department of
State departments of agriculture of the United States
State forestry agencies in the United States
Government agencies established in 1907
1907 establishments in Oklahoma